Manoj Mansinh Parmar (born 1 March 1967) is a former Indian cricketer.  Parmar was a right-handed batsman who fielded as a wicket-keeper.  He was born in Botad, Gujarat.

Parmar made his first-class debut for Saurashtra in the 1991–92 Ranji Trophy against Maharashtra.  Parmar played first-class cricket from the 1991–92 season to season 2001–02, making 40 first-class appearances. In his 40 matches, he scored 1,256 runs at a batting average of 20.93, with a high score of 71*. His highest score came against Orissa in 2000. In his capacity as a wicket-keeper, he took 79 catches and made 16 stumpings.

Parmar also played List A cricket for Saurashtra, making his debut in that format against Baroda in the 1993–94 Ranji Trophy One Day tournament.  He played a further 23 List A matches for Saurashtra, the last coming against Maharashtra in the 2000–01 Ranji Trophy One Day tournament. In his 24 limited-overs matches for the team, he scored 340 runs at an average of 24.28, with a high score of 69*. His highest score came against Maharashtra in his last List A match in India. Behind the stumps he took 21 catches and made 10 stumpings.

He later appeared in a single List A match in England for Oxfordshire against Herefordshire in the 1st round of the 2004 Cheltenham & Gloucester Trophy which was held in 2003. He was dismissed for 1 run in this match by Franklyn Rose.

References

External links
Manoj Parmar at ESPNcricinfo
Manoj Parmar at CricketArchive

1967 births
Living people
People from Gujarat
Indian cricketers
Saurashtra cricketers
Oxfordshire cricketers
People from Botad
Wicket-keepers